Streblognathus is a genus of ants in the subfamily Ponerinae. The genus contains two species found in southern Africa.

Species
 Streblognathus aethiopicus (Smith, 1858)
 Streblognathus peetersi Robertson, 2002

Biology
Both species of Streblognathus lack morphological queens. They belong to the minority of Ponerinae in which all workers are able to mate and store sperm. Young nestmate workers interact aggressively to establish a dominance hierarchy that regulates which individual becomes the single gamergate (mated egglaying worker).

References

External links

Ponerinae
Ant genera
Hymenoptera of Africa